Denmark is a surname and a masculine given name. Notable people with the name are as follows:

Surname
 Erik Denmark (born c. 1980), American competitive eater
 Leila Denmark (1898–2012), American pediatrician
 Robert Denmark (born 1968), British middle- and long-distance runner
 Scott E. Denmark, American organic chemist 
 Stephen Denmark (born 1996), American football player

Given name
 Denmark Vesey (c. 1767–1822), North American slave (later freedman) and instigator of a slave revolt
 Denmark Vessey (born 1984), American rapper and record producer

Masculine given names